The Legend of Bonnie & Clyde is the sixth studio album by Merle Haggard and The Strangers released on Capitol Records in 1968. It rose to number 6 on the Billboard country albums chart.

Background
The title track to this album became Haggard's third consecutive number one country single, but it was its B-side, "I Started Loving You Again" (the "Today" was added to the title later), that became a standard and his most covered song. In the book Merle Haggard: The Running Kind, David Cantwell discusses the song's impact, noting that between 1968 and 1975 alone "at least sixty recordings of the song were released. There have been pushing that many again in the decades since, and that's without counting the times it's been performed on television through the years, or during mega-star arena shows and don't-forget-to-tip-your-waitress bar sets, or the just-for-fun semipro and amateur versions YouTube lists into the thousands." Singer Bonnie Owens, Haggard's then-wife and band member, played a crucial role in the song's creation. In the episode of CMT's Inside Fame that was dedicated to Haggard's career, Owens remembers that Merle "thought he was out of love with me and wanted out..." Haggard picks up the story, remembering that they were walking through an airport: "I looked at this woman, and she was gorgeous, an absolutely gorgeous lady, and I said, 'You know what?  I think I started lovin' you again today.' And she said, 'Turn that around.' And I said, 'Turn what around?' 'Today I started lovin' you again.'  I said, 'That gives you half of it.' A few days later Haggard wrote the song alone in a motel room in Dallas. In the same episode of Inside Fame, an emotional Haggard chokes up remembering the first time he played it for her, adding, "Some things are hard to tell."

Owens also co-wrote the album's title track, which was inspired by the 1967 Arthur Penn film Bonnie and Clyde. The song is one of the few Haggard hits from this period to not feature James Burton on guitar, but Glen Campbell, who was about to crack the pop charts with "By the Time I Get to Phoenix" and plays banjo on Haggard's track. The album contains only two songs composed solely by Haggard, with the singer relying on country songwriter Dallas Frazier for three songs and also recording selections by old friends Tommy Collins and Wynn Stewart.  "Money Tree" was originally recorded by Haggard's hero Lefty Frizzell.

The Legend of Bonnie & Clyde was reissued by BGO Records along with Pride in What I Am in 2002.

Reception

Stephen Thomas Erlewine of AllMusic admires the "unconventional" covers that Haggard chose to record, but states that "they're all overshadowed by 'I Started Loving You Again,' the timeless ballad Haggard co-wrote with Bonnie Owens that stands as one of his greatest moments. Its presence along with the terrific title track and Haggard & the Strangers' restless but quiet musical exploration make The Legend of Bonnie & Clyde another typically excellent album from Hag, who was on a hell of a hot streak late in the '60s, which this simply continues."

Track listing
"The Legend of Bonnie and Clyde" (Merle Haggard, Bonnie Owens) – 2:04
"Is This the Beginning of the End?" (Wally Lewis, Billy Mize, Wynn Stewart) – 3:03
"Love Has a Mind of Its Own" (Dallas Frazier) – 2:22
"The Train Never Stops (At Our Town)" (Dallas Frazier) – 2:01
"Fool's Castle" (Tommy Collins) – 2:46
"Will You Visit Me on Sundays?" (Dallas Frazier) – 2:50
"My Ramona" (Merle Haggard) – 3:00
"I Started Loving You Again" (Merle Haggard, Bonnie Owens) – 2:20
"Money Tree" (Wayne Walker) – 2:47
"You've Still Got a Place in My Heart" (Leon Payne) – 2:30
"Because You Can't Be Mine" (Merle Haggard) – 2:42

Personnel
Merle Haggard– vocals, guitar

The Strangers:
Roy Nichols – guitar
Norman Hamlet – steel guitar
George French – piano
Jerry Ward – bass
Eddie Burris – drums

with
Lewis Talley – guitar
Billy Mize – guitar
Bonnie Owens – harmony vocals

and
Glen Campbell – guitar, banjo

Chart positions

References

1968 albums
Merle Haggard albums
Capitol Records albums
Albums produced by Ken Nelson (United States record producer)
Depictions of Bonnie and Clyde in music